Kevan David Jones  (born 25 April 1964) is a British Labour Party politician, who has been the Member of Parliament (MP) for North Durham since 2001. He served as a defence minister under Gordon Brown, and resigned as a shadow defence minister in January 2016 in protest against a front bench reshuffle by Labour leader Jeremy Corbyn.

Early life
Jones was born in Nottinghamshire and is the son of a coal miner. He attended Portland Comprehensive School in Worksop and Newcastle Polytechnic and the University of Southern Maine, gaining a BA (Hons) in Government and Public Policy. Before becoming an MP, he was a Newcastle upon Tyne councillor from 1990 to 2001 and Chairman of the Development Committee as well as an elected officer of the GMB Union.

Parliamentary career
Jones was first elected as MP for North Durham in 2001 with a majority of 18,681. After becoming member of Parliament, Jones became a member of the influential Defence Select Committee, and also a member of the Labour Party's Parliamentary Committee. His Private member's bill, the Christmas Day (Trading) Act 2004, successfully passed Parliament, and came into force in December 2004. The Act makes it illegal for large shops to open on Christmas Day.

He was re-elected to the North Durham seat in the 2005 general election, with a majority of 16,781. He polled 64.1% of the vote. His campaigning on behalf of people who had coal health compensation payments deducted by unscrupulous claims handlers influenced the Compensation Act 2006.

Ministerial career
Jones was appointed Parliamentary Under Secretary of State and Minister for Veterans at the Ministry of Defence (MoD) in October 2008.

In August 2009 he was accused of briefing against the Chief of the General Staff, General Sir Richard Dannatt, who had been an outspoken critic of the government's record on equipping troops.
A series of Freedom of information requests had been made concerning Dannat's expenses, and blogger Guido Fawkes "outed" Jones as the culprit, although he did not provide any evidence that directly connected Jones to the requests. Jones, who had tabled Parliamentary questions on Army officials' spending before becoming a minister, denied the allegations and said he had a good working relationship with Dannatt.

Jones publicly apologised to Joanna Lumley in March 2010 after he had accused her of "deathly silence" over misleading advice being given to some Gurkhas following Lumley's successful campaign to allow more Gurkhas to settle in the UK.

In 2017, Jones said that while in office he had sought to revoke the government's agreement with Annington Homes, by which the MoD agreed to rent back military housing sold to the company under the John Major government in 1996, while allowing the company to sell homes the armed forces no longer required, but found it impossible to do so. Jones described the arrangements as "an incredibly bad deal for the taxpayer."

In opposition
In May 2010 Harriet Harman appointed Jones Shadow Minister for the Armed Forces, outside the Shadow Cabinet.  He retained this position under Labour leader Ed Miliband and in Jeremy Corbyn's first appointment of shadow ministers in 2015.

He became a member of the special Select Committee set up to scrutinise the Bill that became the Armed Forces Act 2011. He was also a member of the Public bill committee for the Defence Reform Act 2014.

In December 2015 Jones made public his strong criticism of the new Labour leader Jeremy Corbyn, in particular after Corbyn opposed military intervention in the Syrian civil war. Jones stated "because of [Corbyn's] incompetence, the Tories are getting away with things that are not being properly scrutinised and the people who are suffering are the ones that we represent."

In January 2016, Jones resigned as a Shadow Minister for the Armed Forces, following a reshuffle in which Jeremy Corbyn had promoted Emily Thornberry, who opposes the replacement of the Trident nuclear weapon system, to shadow Defence Secretary. In his resignation letter, Jones said he believed that the country had to "maintain a credible nuclear deterrent, while working to advance global nuclear disarmament."

Jones later supported Owen Smith in the failed attempt to replace Jeremy Corbyn in the 2016 Labour leadership election.

Jones supported the Saudi Arabian-led intervention in Yemen.

Jones has been critical of the way in which many sub-post office franchisees were treated by Post Office Ltd during and after the Horizon IT accounting scandal. On 19 March 2020, he criticised both the organisation and its former CEO, Paula Vennells, in a House of Commons debate.

He is Treasurer of the All-Party Parliamentary Group on Industrial Heritage. He is a member of Labour Friends of Israel.

Mental health
In 2012, in a debate in Parliament on mental health issues and their "taboo", Jones spoke about his experience of having depression, alongside Conservative back-bencher Charles Walker, who spoke about his own 30-year experience of obsessive–compulsive disorder. Jones stated that he had had depression since 1996. Jones and Walker were both later praised for their speeches by Time to Change, a mental health anti-stigma campaign run by charities Mind and Rethink Mental Illness.

In a 2015 public disagreement with Ken Livingstone regarding the Trident nuclear missile system, Livingstone (a former Mayor of London)  told the Daily Mirror  that Jones was "obviously depressed and disturbed" and "should see a GP". Jones responded that the remarks "belong in the dark ages" and that mental health should not be used to attack political differences. Livingstone eventually apologised unreservedly.

Notes

External links
 
 
 Guardian Unlimited Politics – Ask Aristotle: Kevan Jones MP
 BBC Politics page

Video clips
 Keeping Christmas Day special

News items
 Opposing shops opening on Christmas Day in 2004

1964 births
Living people
Alumni of Northumbria University
British trade unionists
Councillors in Newcastle upon Tyne
Labour Party (UK) MPs for English constituencies
Members of the Privy Council of the United Kingdom
People from Worksop
People with mood disorders
Labour Friends of Israel
UK MPs 2001–2005
UK MPs 2005–2010
UK MPs 2010–2015
UK MPs 2015–2017
University of Southern Maine alumni
UK MPs 2017–2019
UK MPs 2019–present